Top Chef VIP is an American reality competition television series that premiered on Telemundo on August 9, 2022. The show is produced by RCN Televisión for Telemundo. It is the second Spanish-language adaptation of the Top Chef format in the United States after Top Chef Estrellas, which was also broadcast on Telemundo between 2014 and 2015.

The series has been renewed for a second season.

Format 
A group of celebrities put their cooking skills to the test and are judged by a panel of professional chefs with two contestants eliminated each week. The winner receives US$100,000.

Seasons

Episodes

Season 1 (2022)

References

External links
 

Top Chef
2022 American television series debuts
2010s American cooking television series
Spanish-language television shows
Reality competition television series
Cooking competitions in the United States
Telemundo original programming